The Broxbourne School is a  coeducational secondary school and sixth form with academy status located in Broxbourne, Hertfordshire, England.

The school began life in 1959 with just under 50 pupils as a grammar school (Broxbourne Grammar School) under the headmastership of Ian Laydon. In 1969 the school became a comprehensive school.
The school was converted to academy status in February 2012. It had been a community school under the direct control of Hertfordshire County Council. The school continues to coordinate with the council for admissions.

The Broxbourne School offers General Certificate of Secondary Education (GCSEs) and Business and Technology Education Council (BTECs) as courses of study for pupils, with A Levels offered in the sixth form. The school also offers the Duke of Edinburgh's Award as an activity for pupils.

Development
The school is set to undergo major redevelopment between 2017 & 2019. This includes a new school and leisure hub, demolition of the old school and approximately 150 new homes to be built on the old site.

Traditionally, students at the school belonged to Austen, Milton, Brontë or Chaucer House before they were renamed.

Notable Old Broxbournians

Roald Bradstock, Olympic athlete and Olympic Artist, A.K.A "The Olympic Picasso"
Deborah Chancellor, writer
Sezen Djouma, child actress
Pat Jennings Jr., football player
Dave Lamb, actor & comedian
Acer Nethercott, coxswain & Olympic silver medallist
Dan Quine, computer scientist and historian
Matthew Spring, football player
Rachel Treweek, first female diocesan bishop in the Church of England

References

External links

Secondary schools in Hertfordshire
Academies in Hertfordshire
Broxbourne
1959 establishments in England
Educational institutions established in 1959